A.J. Ghent [ j-ent ], also known as Aubrey Ghent Jr., (born September 18, 1986, in Fort Pierce, Florida) is a third-generation singer-songwriter, Record producer and lap and pedal steel guitar player. Ghent has become known through many viral videos, for making his guitar sing.

Ghent was born into a legacy of famous lap steel guitar players such as his great uncle Willie Eason, grandfather Henry Nelson, and father Aubrey Ghent Sr, who greatly influenced his son's career. His grandfather Henry Nelson was the founder of the "Sacred Steel" rhythmic style played by many steel guitarists today including Robert Randolph, The Lee Boys, The Campbell Brothers. AJ Ghent's debut studio album (March 16, 2018), The Neo Blues Project, debuted No. 7 on the Blues Billboard Charts, and reached the No. 11 spot on the Top 50 Blues Rock Roots Music Report in February 2018.

Noted Performances
Ghent was the leader of AJ Ghent Band and toured supporting Zac Brown Band in 2013–2014.
Ghent performed with Colonel Bruce Hampton in 2013.
Ghent performed "One Way Out" with The Allman Brothers in March 2012 at The Beacon Theatre in New York City
Ghent also performed with Derek Trucks and Susan Tedeschi in Minnesota in June 2012

Recordings

{| class="wikitable"
|+Singles
!Year
!Single
!Artist
!Album
|-
|2017
|"Heartbeat"
|AJ Ghent
|Heartbeat
|-
|2016
|"Love Me No Mo'"
|AJ Ghent Band
|[https://open.spotify.com/album/6ZTLyGNjTo3LjohQsEwDnV?si=ftvVGiGIRziLStAvUPCmDA Love Me No Mo''']
|-
|2013
|"Elevator Love"
|AJ Ghent Band
|Elevator Love
|-
|2012 
|"One Way Out"
|The Allman Brothers Band
|The Allman Brothers Band Live March 2012
|}

References

Bibliography
Robert L. Stone, Sacred Steel: Inside an African American Steel Guitar Tradition'' (University of Illinois Press, 2010)

External links
 www.thebackstagebeat.com
 Glidemagazine.com

1986 births
Living people
People from Fort Pierce, Florida
Steel guitarists
Guitarists from Florida
American male guitarists
21st-century American singers
21st-century American guitarists
20th-century American singers
20th-century American guitarists
American male singer-songwriters
Singer-songwriters from Florida
20th-century American male singers
21st-century American male singers